Zhang Jingsong (born 2 September 1973) is a Chinese former basketball player who competed in the 2000 Summer Olympics and in the 2004 Summer Olympics.

References

1973 births
Living people
Basketball players from Shanxi
Chinese men's basketball players
Sportspeople from Taiyuan
Olympic basketball players of China
Basketball players at the 2000 Summer Olympics
Basketball players at the 2004 Summer Olympics
Asian Games medalists in basketball
Asian Games gold medalists for China
Basketball players at the 1994 Asian Games
Basketball players at the 1998 Asian Games
Basketball players at the 2006 Asian Games
Medalists at the 1994 Asian Games
Medalists at the 1998 Asian Games
1994 FIBA World Championship players